Red Zone or redzone may refer to:

Places
 Red Zone (Iraq), unsafe areas in Iraq after the 2003 invasion
 Red Zone (Islamabad), the area encompassing Pakistan's national government buildings
 Red Zone (World War I) (French: Zone Rouge), a region of France decimated during World War I
 Residential red zone, any of several areas of land zoned unsuitable for housing after the 2011 Christchurch, New Zealand, earthquakes
 Central City Red Zone, a temporary public exclusion zone in Christchurch 
 Quarantined areas in Northern Italy during the COVID-19 pandemic (see COVID-19 pandemic in Italy#First_measures)

Media and entertainment
 Red Zone (card game), a Donruss/NXT Games collectible card game
 Red Zone (G.I. Joe), a fictional character
 Red Zone (video game), by Zyrinx
 Redzone, a band from London, UK
 "RED ZONE", a song from the video game beatmania IIDX 11 IIDXRED

Film and television
 The Red Zone (TV series), a 2021 British comedy
 NFL RedZone, an American television football channel
 Red Zone Channel, a football channel offered as part of DirecTV's NFL Sunday Ticket
 Zone rouge (film) (English: Red zone), a 1985 French movie by Robert Enrico
 Zone Rouge, the French version of the TV game show The Chair

Sports
 Red zone (gridiron football), in American football the area within the 20 yard line of the defensive team
 Red zone, an obsolete term in rugby league football

Other uses
 Red zone (computing), a part of the stack in a central processing unit, or CPU

See also
 Red states and blue states, designating the voting preferences of US states